Vitalia Diatchenko was the defending champion, however she chose not to participate.

The top seed Aleksandra Krunić won the title, defeating Akgul Amanmuradova in the final, 3–6, 6–2, 7–6(8–6).

Seeds

Main draw

Finals

Top half

Bottom half

References 
 Main draw

Ankara Cup - Singles
Ankara Cup